WPLP AM was the first 24-hour news/talk radio station in the Tampa Bay metropolitan area. It began broadcasting at 570 AM on December 4, 1978. Its image name was "News/Talk 57 WPLP: The Talk of Tampa Bay."

The 570 dial position in Tampa Bay began in 1966 as WFSO (not related to the New York State-based current station using those call letters), a low-power, daytime-only station operated by Elwyn Johnson and his son Dan. Under the image name of "Big 57," WFSO was a Top 40 station that evolved in the early 1970s into hard rock. The station was purchased in 1978 and converted to WPLP.

The owners of the new talk station was a conglomerate of three investors, including Paul Bilzerian, who would later go on to become a corporate raider, and Michael Spears, a Dallas radio personality. Bilzerian and the other two investors bickered over finances  and soon the station went into Chapter 11 bankruptcy protection, to be reacquired by Dan Johnson.

By 1984, the station was owned as a standalone AM by Guy Gannett Broadcasting, and broadcast out of a modified trailer that sat off the then-unpaved 82nd Avenue North in Seminole, and on the edge of a swamp; the dirt road and swampy location were the objects of frequent jokes on WPLP and other stations (who nicknamed it "Plop 57" in a corruption of its call letters). It was an affiliate of CBS News and of Larry King's syndicated late-night radio show. Popular local personalities over its ten-year history included John Eastman, David Gold, Dave Scott, Richard Shanks, Tim Coles, Tedd Webb, Ken Charles, Don Richards (a newscaster who was also the station's program director) Nanci Donnellan, Valerie Geller, Gordon Byrd, Chuck Harder, David Fowler, Sam Cardinale, who later became an award-winning reporter at 97 WFLA (and later a reporter at WTVT- Channel 13), Rick Samples, and Bob Lassiter. Among the news people who cut their teeth at WPLP in the early days are John McConnell, Terry McElhatton, Dave Hayes and Steve Triggs.

Although WPLP was the first talk radio station in Tampa Bay, it struggled in the market. It briefly (August 1981-December 1982) had competition in WNSI at AM 1380, but when NSI changed its format WPLP went head-to-head with WFLA, a station with a more powerful signal and larger budget that routinely beat WPLP in the ratings after it switched to news/talk in 1986. It was only in the mid-80s, when Fowler and Lassiter arrived, that WPLP became genuinely competitive. Fowler and his morning-show competition at WFLA (first Jack Ellery, then Dick Norman) swapped ratings victories, while Bob Lassiter won his timeslots in every Arbitron ratings book with double his competitors' numbers before departing for WFLA in September 1987.

WPLP was what is known as a "pig" in the radio industry: a low-budget station with little financial success and a poor signal—one that didn't even reach as far as Tampa in inclement weather (partly because Cuban state radio broadcast at 570 AM.  In 1986 Gannett applied for a power increase which, at the time, was limited to 5,000 watts day and night for this frequency by developing a new 6 tower array north of Tampa. But at nighttime, in violation of the international broadcast regulations; the station received interference from a Cuban station.  While the FCC was considering the power increase Gannett petitioned for additional nighttime power of 10,000 watts based on similar request at Gannett's Miami station WINZ. So WPLP became the 1st station that had more power at night than day.  The station installed a pair of 10,000 watt Continental transmitters and phasor.  The day and night signal covered from north of Tampa all the way to Sarasota, that solved the Cuban interference problem over the market. Despite Gannett and the staff's best efforts, WPLP had a tremendously hard time selling advertising time. Their target audience was Tampa Bay's sizable population of retirees; while that audience gave the station a loyal following, it was outside the 25-54 age group that is the most important demographic for advertisers. Yet even when Lassiter ruled the airwaves, its sales staff had a very few clients (and those were often threatened with boycotts by opponents of the controversial and caustic Lassiter).

In 1987, Gannett negotiated with Susquehanna Radio Corporation to purchase WHVE-FM to pair with WPLP and WKIS in Orlando to pair up with Gannett's WSSP. Gannet would then have AM/FM operation in both Tampa and Orlando to go along with their Miami Radio WINZ-AM/FM.  The final arrangement was to transfer WPLP to Susquehanna and WKIS to Gannett and became effective on March 4, 1988, fired several staffers (including Fowler and Richards), and applied for new call letters. Within one month, WPLP had ceased to exist. All but one (John Eastman) of its air staff had been released, new offices and studio were found in St. Petersburg, and the station had become WTKN, which subsequently plummeted into ratings insignificance with shares below 1 percent.

Today, following further sales to other owners, the 570 frequency is occupied by WTBN, a religious radio station owned by Salem Communications.

References

Mass media in St. Petersburg, Florida
PLP
Defunct radio stations in the United States
Radio stations established in 1966
1966 establishments in Florida
1988_disestablishments_in_Florida 
Radio_stations_disestablished_in_1988
PLP